What is it? is a common interrogational phrase.

What is it or variation may also refer to:

 What is it reflex, the psychological reflex to a novel input, causing the phrase "What is it?"
 "What Is It", a 2007 song and 2008 single by Baby Bash off the 2007 album Cyclone
 What Is It?, a 2005 U.S. surrealist film
 What Is It? (album), a 2003 album by Naturally 7
 Zip the Pinhead (1857–1927), William Henry Johnson, a U.S. freakshow performer, also called "The What Is It?"

See also

 
 What It Is (disambiguation)
 It Is What It Is (disambiguation)